Auberge du Soleil (meaning "Sun inn" in French) is a restaurant and resort in Rutherford, California, operated by Auberge Resorts. The restaurant and room interiors were created by California designer Michael Taylor. Their first chef was  Masataka Kobayashi, who later founded Masa's in San Francisco. Auberge started as a restaurant in 1983, later adding the resort. It was ranked fifth in the top ten resorts in the US by Condé Nast Traveler in 2013.

References

External links
Auberge du Soleil website

Restaurants in the San Francisco Bay Area
Resorts in California
Companies based in Napa County, California
1983 establishments in California
Tourist attractions in Napa County, California
Restaurants established in 1983